Saint-Ouën-des-Vallons is a former commune in the Mayenne department in north-western France.

From 1 January 2019 the commune was unified with Montsûrs-Saint-Céneré, Deux-Évailles and Montourtier, and the new municipality took the name of Montsûrs.

See also 

 Communes of the Mayenne department

References 

Saintouendesvallons